Luvuyiso 'MB' Lusaseni (born 16 December 1988) is a former South African rugby union player for the  in the Rugby Challenge. He played first class rugby between 2009 and 2016, making in excess of 100 appearances.

He also played representative rugby for South Africa Schools in 2006, South Africa Under-20 in 2008, the South African Barbarians in 2012 and the South African Universities team in 2013. He retired from rugby union at the end of 2016 to concentrate on the production of his own craft beer.

Career
He earned a call-up to the S.A. Schools team in 2006 and also joined the  academy in 2007. The following year, he was included in the South Africa Under-20 team for the 2008 IRB Junior World Championship.

A few further games followed over the next year before he had a short spell with the  during the 2010 Currie Cup Premier Division.

References

1988 births
Living people
Griquas (rugby union) players
Leopards (rugby union) players
Lions (United Rugby Championship) players
Rugby union flankers
Rugby union locks
Rugby union players from East London, Eastern Cape
Sharks (Currie Cup) players
South Africa Under-20 international rugby union players
South African rugby union players